Sannicandro is the name of two towns in the south-east Italian region of Apulia, and of the municipalities named after them:

 Sannicandro di Bari, in the Province of Bari
 Sannicandro Garganico (today San Nicandro Garganico), in the Province of Foggia